Victor Brox (5 May 1941 – 20 February 2023) was an English blues musician.

Early life and career
Born in Ashton-under-Lyne, Lancashire, he attended St Mary’s, Droylsden and William Hulme's Grammar School where he played trombone in the school cadet force band. Brox played a variety of musical instruments including horns, keyboards and guitar, as well as singing.

Brox was described by Jimi Hendrix and Tina Turner as their favourite white blues singer, and wrote the anthemic song "Warning" on Black Sabbath's first album. Though continuing to perform with the Victor Brox Blues Train, he is most widely known for his performance as Caiaphas on the original recording of Jesus Christ Superstar (1970) and for his collaborations.

Over the course of his career Brox worked with Eric Clapton, Jimi Hendrix, Ritchie Blackmore and Ian Gillan of Deep Purple, Screaming Lord Sutch, Charlie Mingus, Memphis Slim, Dr. John, Aynsley Dunbar, Graham Bond, Alexis Korner, John Mayall, Country Joe McDonald, Peter Bardens, Keith Moon and Dave Wood.

Brox was the lead singer of The Aynsley Dunbar Retaliation in which he also played keyboards (usually the organ), and sometimes the cornet.

Brox appeared as a "look-alike" of Leonardo da Vinci in the film Ever After (uncredited, 1998).

Personal life and death
Victor Brox died on 20 February 2023, at the age of 81.

His daughter Kyla Brox is also a blues musician.

References

External links
Victor Brox at Knights in Blue Denim
Victor Brox 1997 and 1988 French recordings
 

1941 births
2023 deaths
People from Ashton-under-Lyne
British blues pianists
English blues guitarists
English blues singers
English keyboardists
English male guitarists
English male singers
People educated at William Hulme's Grammar School
Musicians from Manchester
Screaming Lord Sutch and the Savages members
British male pianists
21st-century pianists
21st-century British male musicians